Astra Manufacturing Polytechnic is a  technical institute in Jakarta, Indonesia and is  known  as Polman. Polman is a term formed from the Indonesian words Politeknik Manufaktur.  

It was established as the Federal Technic Academy in 1995. The institution changed its name to Astra Manufacturing Polytechnic  in 1999 under the sponsorship of Astra International, a conglomerate based in Jakarta.

From 1995 through the end of 2003, Polman has graduated 404 students. Astra Group itself generally employs over half of the graduated student product.

Academics
Astra Politechnic provides education to an average of 200 students per year in the following areas:
 Manufacturing Mechanical Engineering: established in 1995 in cooperation with ATMI Solo.
 Production engineering and Manufacturing Process: established in 1996 in cooperation with Department of Mechanical Engineering of the Bandung Institute of Technology (ITB).
 Information Systems: established in 1999 in cooperation with Department of Information Technology of the Bandung Institute of Technology.
 Automotive Engineering: established in 2003 in cooperation with Astra automotive group and the Bandung Institute of Technology. 
 Mechatronic: established in 2005. The program is developed from subjects that already exist in Polman study program, such as automation, electrical, mechanical, and computer related subjects.

External links
Official site

Colleges in Indonesia
1995 establishments in Indonesia
Educational institutions established in 1995